Breaking News is an American Saddlebred horse who won the Saddlebred Triple Crown in 2008, meaning he won the five-gaited stake in the Lexington Junior League Horse Show, the Five-Gaited World's Grand Championship in the World's Championship Horse Show, and the five-gaited stake in the American Royal Horse Show in the same year.

Life and career
Breaking News is a chestnut gelding who was sired by The Talk of the Town and out of the mare Reedann's Cascade. He was bred by Dr. Alan Raun of Cumming, Iowa.
Breaking News was trained by Peter Cowart of West Wind Stables in Statesville, North Carolina. He was bought by Beth Arndt and her granddaughter Megan McClure in 2003. In July 2008 Cowart entered him in the Lexington Junior League Horse Show, where he won the five-gaited stake. 

 
Breaking News won the Five-Gaited World's Grand Championship at the World's Championship Horse Show in late August. In November he won the five-gaited stake in the American Royal Horse Show, making him a Saddlebred Triple Crown winner; a horse who wins the American Royal, Lexington Junior League, and World's Championship Horse Shows' five-gaited stake classes in the same calendar year.
At the 2009 Saddlebred Ball, held in February, Breaking News was named the Horse of the Year.

References

Individual American Saddlebreds